Rock Creek Township is a township in Coffey County, Kansas, United States. As of the 2000 census, its population was 1,025.

Geography
According to the USGS, it contains three cemeteries: Pleasant View, Rock Creek and Waverly.

Transportation
Rock Creek Township contains one airport or landing strip, Schoolcraft Airport.

References
 USGS Geographic Names Information System (GNIS)

External links
 US-Counties.com
 City-Data.com

Townships in Coffey County, Kansas
Townships in Kansas